Summit Lake is a small lake located on Vancouver Island, Canada, southwest of Cameron Lake.

References

Alberni Valley
Lakes of Vancouver Island
Alberni Land District